The enzyme glucose-1-phosphatase (EC 3.1.3.10) catalyzes the reaction

α-D-glucose 1-phosphate + H2O  D-glucose + phosphate

This enzyme belongs to the family of hydrolases, specifically those acting on phosphoric monoester bonds.  The systematic name is α-D-glucose-1-phosphate phosphohydrolase. This enzyme participates in glycolysis and gluconeogenesis.

Structural studies

As of late 2007, only one structure has been solved for this class of enzymes, with the PDB accession code .

References 

 
 

EC 3.1.3
Enzymes of known structure